Mzwandile Collen Masina (born 2 September 1974) is a South African politician from Gauteng who served as the Executive Mayor of the City of Ekurhuleni Metropolitan Municipality from 2016 to 2021. He is a member of the African National Congress (ANC) and the party's Ekurhuleni chairperson, elected in 2014 and re-elected in 2018. From 2014 to 2016, he served as a Member of the National Assembly of South Africa and as the Deputy Minister of Trade and Industry.

Controversy
In 2020 Masina was driving at high speed in a state police car which is used for transporting VIPs. Masina got involved in an accident with a truck. It was discovered that he was not authorised to drive the car and it was also determined that he was driving during a Covid-19 lockdown curfew.

References

External links
Cllr Zwandile Masina – Ekurhuleni Executive Mayor
People's Assembly – Mzwandile Masina
Mzwandile Masina, Mr – South African Government

Living people
African National Congress politicians
Zulu people
Members of the National Assembly of South Africa
Mayors of places in South Africa
Mayors of Ekurhuleni
1974 births